Henry Raw (born 6 July 1903) was a professional footballer, who played for Tow Law Town, Huddersfield Town and West Bromwich Albion.

References

1903 births
Year of death missing
English footballers
People from Tow Law
Footballers from County Durham
Association football forwards
English Football League players
Huddersfield Town A.F.C. players
West Bromwich Albion F.C. players
Tow Law Town F.C. players
FA Cup Final players